Bošković is a South Slavic surname, derived from the male given name Boško.

It may refer to:

 Anica Bošković, Ragusan writer
 Branko Bošković, Montenegrin football player
 Danko Bošković, Serbian German football player
 Darko Bošković, Serbian football player
 Goran Bošković, several people
 Ivan Bošković, Montenegrin football player
 Lea Bošković, Croatian tennis player
 Magda Bošković, Croatian communist, Partisan and member of the women's rights movement
 Maja Bošković-Stulli, Croatian historian, writer, publisher and academic
 Marko Bošković, Serbian football player
 Momčilo Bošković, Serbian football player
 Miho Bošković, Croatian water polo player
 Miroslav Bošković, Serbian football player
 Momčilo Bošković, Serbian football player
 Nemanja Bošković, Serbian football player
 Nikola Bošković, father of Ruđer Bošković
 Predrag Bošković, Montenegrin politician
 Robert Boskovic Canadian soccer player
 Ruđer Bošković, Ragusan scientist 
 Saša Bošković, Serbian handball coach
 Tanja Bošković, Serbian actress
 Tijana Bošković, Serbian volleyball player

See also
Boškovići, toponym
Boškić

Croatian surnames
Serbian surnames
Patronymic surnames
Surnames from given names